, also written (84719) 2002 VR128, is a trans-Neptunian object (TNO). It was discovered in 2002 by Michael Brown and Chad Trujillo. The object is a plutino, an object in 2:3 orbital resonance with Neptune.

Physical properties 

References

External links 
 Orbit simulation from NASA JPL site
 Orbital details from the IAU Minor Planets Center
 

2002 VR128
Plutinos
2002 VR128
Possible dwarf planets
20021103